Henryk Piotr Siedlaczek (born 30 January 1956 in Wodzisław) is a Polish politician. He was elected to the Sejm on 25 September 2005, getting 7476 votes in 30 Rybnik district as a candidate from the Civic Platform list.

See also
Members of Polish Sejm 2005-2007

External links
Henryk Siedlaczek - parliamentary page - includes declarations of interest, voting record, and transcripts of speeches.

Members of the Polish Sejm 2005–2007
Civic Platform politicians
1956 births
Living people
Members of the Polish Sejm 2007–2011
Members of the Polish Sejm 2011–2015